Ares is a municipality in the autonomous community of Galicia in province of A Coruña in northwestern Spain. It is located in the comarca of Ferrol. It spans the coastal strip running from the entrance of the estuary of the Ferrol river to the port of Redes.

Once a year, Ares celebrates the Corpus Christi.

Economy
The economy is based on fishing, tourism and agriculture.

References

Municipalities in the Province of A Coruña